Grand TV is a cable/IPTV music television channel owned by Grand Production. It launched on 16 April 2014.

It broadcasts 24 hours a day, of which nine hours consist of live programming. Programming airs from nine TV studios in Košutnjak, of which three are large and six are small studios. During a break in broadcasting, the channel broadcasts lip syncing singer videos. This is the first music entertainment channel that deals not only with videos of singers, but also activities related to public life.

Series 
  'Grand magazin'  - a daily airing show. In this show viewers tune in via Skype and telephone. There are several presenters in shifts, and their task is to communicate with viewers who can order a song.
  'Halo'  - the show is broadcast twice a week, Tuesdays and Thursdays.
  'Grand cocktail' '- an "author show" by Goran Čomor.
  'An Evening With ...'  - a show that weekly features celebrities. They come as guests bring their colleagues, friends, family and sing their hits accompanied by an orchestra.
 Grand Novelties
  'From Profile'  - programs whose host is Vesna Milanović. In this show the guest is interviewed through different stages of his life, from childhood to the important moments in his career. There is a scroll of family photos in which the singer recalls events and times when they occurred.
  'Grand disco'  - programs whose leader is Milan Mitrovic, surrounded by beautiful dancers and attractive guests who sing their hits.
  'Grand News'  - showbiz news.
  'Doctors for insomnia'  - lead by Goran Petrović. In this show they discuss topics much like a nighttime program.
  'Gipsy & Friends'' - program run by Lidija Vukicevic and Jovana Nikolic. The show primarily airs Romano music.
 VIP Cookbook
 Sport News
 Wandering Camera
 Song for the soul - show airs weekly on Wednesday
 The Te
 That crazy world

References

External links

Television stations in Serbia
Television channels in North Macedonia